Alley of the rulers of Russia is a sculptural composition located in Moscow, Russia. It consists of a set of identical stelae on which busts of all the rulers of Russia are installed, starting with Prince Rurik. The space where the busts are located is a small square, inside the territory at the address - Petroverigsky Lane, house 4, a square near the Turgenev - Botkin estate.

The opening of the alley took place on May 26, 2017. The ceremony was attended by Minister of Culture of the Russian Federation Vladimir Medinsky and Minister of Education Olga Vasilyeva. The busts of the Soviet leaders were opened on September 22, 2017, and the bust of the first President of the Russian Federation Boris Yeltsin was opened on April 23, 2018.

The sculptor who made all the busts is Zurab Tsereteli.

List of rulers represented on the alley 

 Rurik
 Oleg the Seer
 Olga of Kiev
 Sviatoslav I
 Vladimir the Great
 Yaroslav the Wise
 Vladimir Monomakh
 Yuri the Long Hands
 Andrey the Pious
 Vsevolod the Big Nest 
 Alexander Nevsky
 Ivan I Kalita
 Dmitry of the Don
 Vasily II the Blind
 Ivan III the Great
 Vasili III
 Ivan IV the Terrible
 Feodor I
 Boris Godunov
 Michael Romanov
 Alexis I
 Sophia Alekseyevna 
 Peter I the Great
 Anna Ioannovna
 Elizabeth Petrovna
 Peter III
 Catherine II the Great
 Paul I 
 Alexander I
 Nicholas I
 Alexander II
 Alexander III
 Nicholas II
 Georgy Lvov
 Alexander Kerensky
 Vladimir Lenin
 Joseph Stalin
 Nikita Khrushchev
 Leonid Brezhnev
 Yuri Andropov
 Konstantin Chernenko
 Mikhail Gorbachev
 Boris Yeltsin

Notes

References 

 http://moscowalk.ru/cao/basmannyi/vystavki/alley-of-rulers.html
 http://www.aif.ru/dontknows/actual/chto_takoe_alleya_praviteley_i_chi_byusty_tam_ustanovyat
 http://iamruss.ru/alleya-pravitelej-v-moskve/
 http://rvio.histrf.ru/activities/news/item-3509

Monuments and memorials in Moscow
Sculptures of men in Russia
Outdoor sculptures in Russia
Moscow